Nõmme (Estonian for "Heath") is one of the 8 administrative districts of Tallinn, the capital of Estonia. The district is largely a middle-class  suburban area, mostly consisting of listed private homes  from the 1920s and 1930s and is sometimes referred to as the "Forest Town."

History
Nõmme was founded by Nikolai von Glehn, the owner of Jälgimäe Manor, in 1873  as a summerhouse district. The development started around the railway station. In 1926 it was granted town rights, but in the beginning of the Soviet occupation in 1940, it was merged with Tallinn and remains as one of the eight districts of Tallinn to date.

There are many historical sights in Nõmme, such as the Glehn's Castle, Kalevipoeg sculpture (also known as "Glehn's Devil"), the "Victoria Palace" cinema, and Nõmme Market. Other important sights include Vanaka hill, the ski jumping tower, Rahumäe cemetery, and Pääsküla Bog.

Geography
Nõmme is divided into 10 subdistricts: Hiiu, Kivimäe, Laagri, Liiva, Männiku, Nõmme, Pääsküla, Rahumäe, Raudalu, Vana-Mustamäe.

There are 6 stations in Nõmme on the Western route of Elron: Rahumäe, Nõmme, Hiiu, Kivimäe, Pääsküla, Laagri. The Western route of Edelaraudtee passes through Liiva station, which is also located in Nõmme.

Population

Nõmme has a population of 39,422.

Image gallery

See also
Nõmme Kalju FC

References

External links

Districts of Tallinn